

List of Ambassadors

Amir Weissbrod 2018 - 
Einat Shlain 2015 - 2017
Daniel Nevo 2009 - 2015
Jacob Rosen 2006 - 2009
Yacov Hadas-Handelsman 2003 - 2006
David Dadonn 2000 - 2003
Oded Eran 1997 - 2000

References

Jordan
Israel